Allopentarthrum is a genus of true weevil. It contains the following species:

 Allopentarthrum elumbe (Boheman, 1838)

Cossoninae